The 1981 Montana State Bobcats football team represented the Montana State University as a member of the Big Sky Conference during the 1981 NCAA Division I-AA football season. Led by Sonny Lubick in his fourth and final year as head coach, the Bobcats compiled an overall record of 3–7 and a mark of 1–6 in conference play, placing seventh in the Big Sky.

Schedule

Roster

References

Montana State
Montana State Bobcats football seasons
Montana State Bobcats football